Dashavatar or Dashavtar generally refers to Dashavatara, the ten incarnations of the god Vishnu in Hindu mythology.

Dashavatar may also refer to:
 Dasavathaaram, released in Hindi as Dashavtar, a 2008 Indian Tamil film starring Kamal Hassan
 Dasavataram (film), 1976 Indian Tamil film
 Dasavathaaram, a 2008 Indian Tamil film
 Dashavatar (film), a 2008 animated film in Hindi
 Dashavathara (film), a 1960 Indian Kannada film
 Dashavatari Ganjifa, ten-suited playing cards in which each suit represents an incarnation of Vishnu
 Dashavatara Temple, Deogarh, a temple in Deogarh, Uttar Pradesh